Spodnji Slemen is a dispersed settlement in the hills above the left bank of the Drava River in the Municipality of Selnica ob Dravi in northeastern Slovenia.

Name
The name of the settlement was changed from Slemen to Spodnji Slemen in 1952.

Viltuš Manor
Viltuš Manor is an originally 17th-century manor house refurbished in 1885 that stands in a park above the left bank of the Drava River in the southern part of the settlement.

References

External links
Spodnji Slemen on Geopedia

Populated places in the Municipality of Selnica ob Dravi